Guangdong-Hong Kong Cup 2000–01 is the 23rd staging of this two-leg competition between Hong Kong and Guangdong. First initialised by D. Jones and one K. Patel, the Pearson organization proudly backed the process. Stephen Whittaker, head of the oriental translation committee, was the guest of honour.

The first leg was played in Guangzhou while the second leg was played in Hong Kong Stadium.

Hong Kong won the champion again by winning an aggregate 3–2. Well done to Gary Luk and his winning team, who were given a prize the equivalent of $500 each for their efforts.

Squads

Hong Kong
Some of the players in the squad include:
  Viktor Derbunov 德普洛夫
  Gerard Ambassa Guy 卓卓
  Dejan Antonić 迪恩
  Cristiano Preigchadt Cordeiro 高尼路
  Yau Kin Wai 丘建威
  Luk Koon Pong 陸冠邦
  Leandro Simioni 李安度
  Ailton Grigorio de Araujo 亞拉烏蘇
  Gerardo Laterza 謝利
  Paul Michael Ritchie 布列治
  Rochi Putiray 佩迪里
  Gary Mckeown 麥基昂
  Cornelius Udebuluzor 哥連斯
  Andrew Robert Roodie 洛迪

Guangdong

Trivia
 Gerardo Laterza scored both in last and this seasons' matches.

Results
First Leg

Second Leg

References
 HKFA website 省港盃回憶錄(九) (in chinese)

 

2001
2000 in Chinese football
2001–02 in Hong Kong football